June Leow Hsiad Hui (born 1964) is a Malaysian politician who served as the Member of Parliament (MP) for Hulu Selangor from May 2018 to November 2022 and member of the Hulu Selangor District Council (MDHS). She is a member of the People's Justice Party (PKR), a component party of the Pakatan Harapan (PH) opposition coalition.

Election results

References

Living people
1964 births
Date of birth missing (living people)
Malaysian politicians of Chinese descent
People's Justice Party (Malaysia) politicians
Members of the Dewan Rakyat
Women members of the Dewan Rakyat
21st-century Malaysian politicians
21st-century Malaysian women politicians